Samuel Jasper Loring (1914-1963) was an aeronautical engineer with Chance Vought and later Hamilton Standard who worked on various aspects of the aeroelastic flutter problem.

Biography
He was born in 1914 to Mabel A. (Cross) and Henry Delano Loring. He graduated from the Massachusetts Institute of Technology in 1936. He was awarded the Wright Brothers Medal in 1941 and the ASME Admiral George W. Melville Medal in 1950. He died in 1963.

References 

1914 births
1963 deaths
American aerospace engineers
Massachusetts Institute of Technology alumni
20th-century American engineers